Make Me Famous were a Ukrainian metalcore band. They were founded by lead guitarist and co-vocalist Denis Shaforostov, who gained popularity through his YouTube channel "above92", and songwriter/guitarist Jimmy X Rose. They released one EP and one studio album, titled It's Now or Never.

History

Formation and Keep This in Your Music Player (2010–2011) 
The band formed in 2010 after Denis Shaforostov uploaded his songs for videos on YouTube. He then recruited bassist Sergei Hohlov to create original music. These two then recruited Igor "Jimmy X Rose" Yastrebov on guitar/songwriting because Shaforostov thought to use 3–4 songs written completely by Yastrebov,  in Jimmy and Shaforostov's previous band where they played in together. Soon after, Serj Kravchenko, the former vocalist of Pictures Inside Me, joined the band on lead vocals. Jace Thomas was later recruited to play drums, respectively.

In early 2011, the band released their first EP entitled Keep This in Your Music Player. The EP features the songs "Make It Precious", "I Am A Traitor. No One Does Care" and "Once You Killed a Cow, You Gotta Make a Burger", all of which were included on the band's debut record. The three songs were not re-recorded for the debut album, instead the exact versions on this EP were included onto the album.

Drummer Jace Thomas was kicked out of the band in 2011 because he allegedly leaked instrumentals of the band's music. He was replaced by former Rose Funeral drummer Dusty Boles.

It's Now or Never (2011–2012) 
On September 30, 2011, they officially announced that they were signed to Sumerian Records.

On March 27, 2012, the band released their debut album titled It's Now or Never The album peaked at No. 151 on the Billboard 200, No. 13 on the Hard Rock Albums chart, No. 5 on the Heatseekers Chart, No. 26 on the Top Independent Albums chart, and No. 37 on the Top Rock Albums.

Unreleased single and reorganization (2012–2013) 
The band had begun playing a new song entitled "Locked & Loaded" in 2012, but never reached its final recording stages to be released.

At the end of November 2012, founding member and frontman Denis Shaforostov was kicked out of the band by the other four members, and was subsequently dropped from Sumerian Records. The reason was because of constant conflicts between Shaforostov and the rest of the band. Sumerian Records when announcing that they dropped the band was simply stated "It's a shame when band members cannot get along with each other." Make Me Famous then held one final tour after Shaforostov had been fired before officially breaking up.

The remaining members minus Shaforostov promised to return with a new band. They created a new band called Oceans Red.

Style and influences
Allmusic has described the band as "Ukraine five-piece with a slick approach to metalcore and emo." Common breakdowns are present in the band's music as well as large use of electronics. Screamed and sung vocals were performed by Denis Shaforostov while growled vocals were done by Serj Kravchenko. The band's influences include Bruno Mars, Def Leppard, and Asking Alexandria. Kravchenko has cited vocalist Phil Bozeman of Whitechapel as an influence for his growls.

Band members

Final line-up
 Sergei Hohlov – bass guitar 
 Jimmy X Rose – rhythm guitar 
 Serj Kravchenko – growled vocals, programming, synthesizers 
 Dusten "Dusty" Boles – drums

Previous members
Jace Thomas - drums 
 Denis Stoff – lead vocals, lead guitar , programming, synthesizers 
 Tommy Kares - drums (studio only)

Timeline

Timeline (as Oceans Red)

Discography

Albums 

 It's Now or Never (2012)

EPs
 "Keep This in Your Music Player" (2011)

Singles
 "Make It Precious" – January 20, 2011
 "I Am A Traitor. No One Does Care" – February 22, 2011
 "Once You Killed A Cow - You Gotta Make A Burger" – April 6, 2011
 "We Know It's Real" – October 4, 2011
 "Blind Date 101" – April 5, 2012

Music videos
 "Make It Precious" (2011)
 "Make It Precious (Acoustic)" (2011)
 "Blind Date 101" (2012)

References

Ukrainian heavy metal musical groups
Ukrainian musical groups
Metalcore musical groups
Electronicore musical groups
Musical groups disestablished in 2012
Musical quintets
Sumerian Records artists